The Daily Mountain Eagle is a daily newspaper servicing the Jasper, Alabama area. The paper is owned by Paxton Media Group and operated locally. It is one of only two corporation papers that provides information to the locals in the immediate area (alongside The Birmingham News). While the newspaper focuses on local news, it also reports on national and international matters.

History
The Daily Mountain Eagle was initially founded in 1872 under the name Mountain Eagle, and published weekly. J.F. Anthony  bought a press in Tuscaloosa, Alabama. in 1872 to start a newspaper in Jasper, former editor Michael D. Anderson, Sr. said. Anthony was told  “Man, you’re going to need an eagle to deliver newspapers in those mountains.” According to another former editor Skip Tucker, the name derived from a joke the mule driver who delivered its first press—that "only an eagle could deliver the news." In 1960, after a merger of The Walker County Times, The Jasper Advertiser, and The Mountain Eagle, the newspaper was renamed as the Daily Mountain Eagle and changed to daily publication.

Prior to March 2016, the Twitter handle "Dailymtneagle" operated as an anonymous impostor site, but the operator shut it down, reportedly to avoid being outed. He outed himself in a column soon after.

James Phillips, a native of Walker County, Alabama and a 20 year news veteran, was named publisher of the Daily Mountain Eagle in April 2016.

The last edition of The Daily Mountain Eagle to be printed in the local pressroom in Jasper, Alabama was published on Friday September 16. 2022. After that edition, the printing of future editions of The Daily Mountain  Eagle will occur "off-site" at The Daily Corinthian facility in Corinth, Mississippi, which is also owned by the Paxton  Media Group. This move led to a significant reduction of employees at the local facility of the newspaper in Jasper, Alabama.

References

External links
 Daily Mountain Eagle Home page
 People and things from the Walker County, Alabama mountain eagle, a series of books republishing clippings from archived copies of the newspaper

Newspapers published in Alabama
Daily newspapers published in the United States
Walker County, Alabama
1872 establishments in Alabama
Publications established in 1872